Jan van Breda Kolff (born December 16, 1951) is an American former college and professional basketball player and college basketball head coach. The son of coach Butch van Breda Kolff and grandson of  Dutch soccer player Jan van Breda Kolff, he played from 1975 to 1983 for the Denver Nuggets, Kentucky Colonels, and Virginia Squires in the American Basketball Association, and the New York/New Jersey Nets in the National Basketball Association. From 1970 to 1974 he played for Vanderbilt University, and in 1974 he led the Commodores to a Southeastern Conference championship as SEC Player of the Year.

He also spent two years in Italy, from 1983 to 1985, helping Italian team Virtus Bologna win a championship.

Coaching career
Van Breda Kolff's tenure at St. Bonaventure ended abruptly in controversy late in the 2002–03 season. St. Bonaventure declared junior college transfer Jamil Terrell eligible to play without sitting out a year (as he would have been under NCAA rules if he had earned an associate degree), even though Terrell had only earned a welding certificate.  Athletic director Gothard Lane had told school president Robert Wickenheiser that Terrell was ineligible to play that year.  However, Wickenheiser, under prodding from his son Kort, who was also one of Van Breda Kolff's assistants, unilaterally declared Terrell eligible. School officials didn't seek guidance from the NCAA about Terrell's eligibility until the 2002–03 season was nearly over.  The Bonnies were forced to forfeit every game in which Terrell played, and were also barred from the Atlantic 10 Conference tournament.  In protest, the Bonnies players opted to sit out the last two games.  Van Breda Kolff denied knowing about the scandal, and was cleared of wrongdoing.

On April 25, 2007, he was named as one of three finalists to become the new head coach of UC Riverside's men's basketball program.

Van Breda Kolff was named coach of the Nashville Broncos of the American Basketball Association in 2008.  He stayed with the team through its name change to the Music City Stars, but lost his job when the team disbanded in 2010.

Head coaching record

References

External links
 Career stats

1951 births
Living people
American expatriate basketball people in Italy
American men's basketball players
American people of Dutch descent
Basketball coaches from California
Basketball players from California
College men's basketball head coaches in the United States
Cornell Big Red men's basketball coaches
Denver Nuggets players
Kentucky Colonels players
New Jersey Nets players
New Orleans Hornets assistant coaches
New York Nets players
People from Palos Verdes, California
Pepperdine Waves men's basketball coaches
Portland Trail Blazers draft picks
Small forwards
Sportspeople from Los Angeles County, California
St. Bonaventure Bonnies men's basketball coaches
Vanderbilt Commodores men's basketball coaches
Vanderbilt Commodores men's basketball players
Virginia Squires draft picks
Virginia Squires players
Virtus Bologna players